Salford Royal Hospital (formerly known as Hope Hospital) is a large university teaching hospital in Pendleton, Salford, England operated by Northern Care Alliance NHS Foundation Trust. It is one of the top-performing hospitals in the United Kingdom.

History

The original hospital in Salford was established in Chapel Street in 1827 and was known as the Salford and Pendleton Dispensary. It became the Salford and Pendleton Royal Hospital and Dispensary in 1847 and the Salford Royal Hospital in the 1870s. 

In June 1941, during the Manchester Blitz, the hospital on Chapel Street was struck by German bombs and 14 nurses died. Following the formation of the NHS Trust in 1990 and budget cuts imposed by the Government in the early 1990s, the hospital on Chapel Street closed in 1994 and was converted into luxury flats. A memorial stone tablet to commemorate the nurses killed during the Blitz remains above the original Chapel Street entrance.

Meanwhile, the original hospital in Hope, which was built on the south side of Eccles Road between 1880 and 1882 to accommodate sick paupers working at the local workhouse, was known as the Salford Union Infirmary. The hospital became known as Hope Hospital, taking the name of the medieval Hope Hall, which had been demolished in 1956. A redevelopment scheme for Hope Hospital was procured under a Private Finance Initiative contract in 2007. The construction work, which was designed by Ryder / HKS and carried out by Balfour Beatty at a cost of £136 million, was completed in 2012. The hospital at Hope was rebranded as the Salford Royal Hospital during the redevelopment.

In January 2018, it was announced that a major trauma centre, complete with a rooftop helipad, would be built at the Salford Royal Hospital at a cost of £48 million. It is intended that 90 per cent of all major trauma patients in the Greater Manchester area will be treated there once it is completed.

See also
 Healthcare in Greater Manchester
 Manchester Medical School
 List of hospitals in England

References
Citations

Bibliography

External links
Salford Royal NHS Foundation Trust (Website no longer updated)
Double Helix LED sculpture – Salford NHS Trust sculpture
Faculty of Medical and Human Sciences, The University of Manchester
Northern Care Alliance

Hospital buildings completed in 1882
1882 establishments in England
Buildings and structures in Salford
Hospitals established in 1882
Hospitals in Greater Manchester
NHS hospitals in England
Teaching hospitals in England
Health in Greater Manchester
Poor law infirmaries